The Dleskovec Plateau, probably named after Mount Dleskovec in its central part, rarely also named the Vestibule, is a karstified mountain plateau in the eastern part of the Kamnik–Savinja Alps in northern Slovenia. It lies between the Roban Valley, the Upper Savinja Valley, and the Lučka Bela Valley, to the southeast of Mount Ojstrica and to the northeast of the Big Pasture Plateau. It is oriented in the direction from the southeast to the northwest. The highest point of the plateau is Mount Big Peak, also located in its central part. Administratively, the Dleskovec Plateau belongs to the settlement of Podveža in the Municipality of Luče.

There are several mountain pastures on the plateau. On the southern side, there are Podvežak Pasture with a hut, Ravne Pasture, and Vodole Pasture. There is also Planinšek Farm or Planica, which is the highest-elevation farm on the plateau. On the northern side, the largest is Molič Pasture with Kocbek Refuge. Above the latter stands a chapel dedicated to Sts. Cyril and Methodius. Vodotočnik Pasture is situated in the western part. On this pasture, there are a small heart-shaped pond and a shepherd hut. Below Vodotočnik Pasture, there is a scree slope. On the slope north of it, there are some hummocky meadows.

It has been significantly altered by glaciers in the Pleistocene and by snow. There are almost no streams on the plateau. The climate is Alpine, with the average yearly temperature about 0 °C, the average winter temperature about −7 °C, and the average summer temperature about 7.5 °C.  The plateau is mostly overgrown by deciduous forest, with predominance of beech (Fagus sylvatica), larch (Larix decidua), and spruce (Picea abies).

References

External links

Kamnik–Savinja Alps
Karst plateaus of Slovenia
Karst fields
Municipality of Luče